Yevgeni Borisovich Pupkov (18 January 1976 – 24 July 2021) was a Kazakhstani ice hockey defenseman.

Biography
Pupkov played in the Russian Superleague and Kontinental Hockey League for Torpedo Ust-Kamenogorsk, Metallurg Novokuznetsk, SKA St. Petersburg, Amur Khabarovsk, HC Lada Togliatti and Khimik Voskresensk. He was a member of the Kazakhstan men's national ice hockey team at the 2006 Winter Olympics.

Pupkov died on 24 July 2021, due to COVID-19.

Career statistics

Regular season and playoffs

International

References

External links

1976 births
2021 deaths
Amur Khabarovsk players
Avtomobilist Yekaterinburg players
Kazakhstani ice hockey defencemen
Kazzinc-Torpedo players
Khimik Voskresensk (KHL) players
HC Lada Togliatti players
Metallurg Novokuznetsk players
SKA Saint Petersburg players
Yertis Pavlodar players
Olympic ice hockey players of Kazakhstan
Ice hockey players at the 2006 Winter Olympics
Sportspeople from Oskemen
Deaths from the COVID-19 pandemic in Kazakhstan